Christopher Forsberg (born April 6, 1982), is a self-taught, three-time Formula Drift Champion and Formula Drift World Champion race car driver from Doylestown, Pennsylvania who currently competes in the Formula Drift series in his Nissan Z (Z34) for NOS Energy Drink. He is the owner, lead driver and shop manager of Forsberg Racing.

Considered an ironman in the sport, Forsberg has competed in every round of Formula Drift since 2004. During this time he’s amassed the all time head to head battle wins and most podium finishes in Formula Drift history.

Forsberg Racing with Bryan Heitkotter as their driver will compete in the 2021 Gridlife Touring Cup wheel to wheel racing championship. Their entry is a Nissan 370z. 

Closing out the 2020 Formula Drift season Forsberg won Best Drifting Style and Forsberg Racing's James Caldwell won Crew Chief of the Year at the Virtual Awards Banquet as voted on by Formula Drift teams.

Forsberg Racing also has two entries in the eSports World Championships. This esports racing series mimics the FIA GT World Challenge and utilizes the Assetto Corsa Competizione software platform. The team consists of Bryan Heitkotter driving a Nissan GT-R GT3 Nismo and Chris Forsberg himself. Forsberg will complete his second esports racing season in the Forsberg Racing Nissan GT-R NISMO GT3.

Early life 
He first got into cars at the age of 10 by attending drag racing events with his uncles at Maple Grove Raceway Park in Pennsylvania. Chris was introduced to the continuous sideways action of flat track motorcycle racing by watching his cousin compete in the sport. This is what planted the seed for early onset slip angle addiction.

As a teenager Forsberg learned how to work on cars with his black 1988 Mazda RX-7 FC. He would then receive multiple tickets from local police for driving infractions. With a suspended license, he had time to obsess over auctions for car parts and work on his passion.

Forsberg credits his brother Erik, Tony Angelo, Initial D and Option Magazine with introducing him to the RX-7 and drifting.

Grassroots Drifting 
In the winter of 2003 Forsberg and some friends descended upon the parking lot of Englishtown, NJ’s Old Bridge Township Raceway Park to hold a drift event.

By March 2003 Mike Napp, then president of the facility, gave the gang his blessing to throw drift events. At Raceway Park Forsberg was introduced to Ryan Tuerck and Vaughn Gittin, JR. Drift Alliance was born.

Professional Drifting Career

2020 
Chris lands on the podium at Round 5 and backs it up with a 1st Place finish in Round 6. Engine failure during Round 7 and 8 took them out of the championship hunt, pulling out a borrowed car to maintain overall points, finishing 5th overall.

2019 
After two years struggling with the VQ platform, the team committed to the Nissan VR38DETT engine. The team finished sixth overall and were able to prove the VR engine’s reliability.

2018 
Chris takes control of the race team yet again and rebuilds the car with his team in southern California. This was a year of growth for the pit crew at Forsberg Racing and a lot of work was put into making the car more competitive. Even with multiple engine failures the team managed several podiums as well as a win in Round 3. The team finished fourth overall.

2017 
Chris moved back to California from Maryland. Nameless Performance took over the race team management and vehicle prep. The team decided to develop a twin turbo VQ35HR engine package versus the V8. The season’s 11th overall finish was due to multiple engine issues and having to use the backup car several times

2016 
Despite not winning an event, Forsberg was crowned Formula Drift champion once again piloting his V8-powered Nissan 370Z. His consistency (two third-place finishes and four second-place finishes, all consecutively) allowed him to take the championship lead after round six in Seattle, which he continued to defend until the final round in Irwindale. He also won the Formula Drift World Championship after participating in a Formula Drift World Championship round in Okayama, Japan, which made him eligible to score World Championship points.

2015 
Third overall. Ran the first half the season without major financial support. Third year in a row of top three championship finishes.

2014 
This season Chris and the team held points position from the first round to the last round (*never lost points position*) and would clinch his second Formula Drift title. Lost NOS Energy Drink as a primary sponsor due to the company’s corporate restructuring resulting in less funds and a raw carbon fiber matte black livery. This season the car was upgraded by 150 hp which included nitrous. The Forsberg Racing team also expanded to include two cars for 2014, with Jhonnattan Castro taking the second seat in an updated version of Forsberg's 2012 370Z chassis. Forsberg also presented the idea of the "Start Line Chicane" to Formula Drift which has now been implemented in nearly every drifting series in the world.

2013 
This season proved to be a contentious one. Chris would get second overall, but not without rumors, wild accusations, and conspiracy theories.

2012 
The team parted ways with their crew chief and Chris moved to Maryland, where MA Motorsports would prepare and build his race cars. Focus was on vehicle weight reduction and engine reliability. The team would finish 11th overall.

2011 
This was Chris’s first full season in a 370Z and a Nissan Motorsports engine. This car had factory angle, factory brakes and factory gas tank. Nissan supplied the chassis and motor. The car was mildly built with a focus on good reliability. The team finished 3rd overall.

2010 
Formula Drift in the new decade brought in more V8s and more power. Midway through 2010 the team installed an upgraded Nissan Motorsports engine adding 200 hp, bringing total horsepower up from approximately 380rwhp to 580rwhp. 2010 proved to be another year of growth for the team in which they set themselves up for future competitiveness.

2009 
Chris would win his first Formula Drift championship, as well as the Tires.com Triple Crown bonus prize (first driver to win both in the same season). His win marks the first time a Formula Drift champion has come from a purely drifting/enthusiast background whereas previous champions had professional motorsport experience.

2008 
NOS Energy Drink commits to a full title sponsorship, building on their previous relationship. The year started off beating Tanner Foust and Sam Hubbinette at Long Beach, taking first place.

2007 
This was the first year Chris was running his own team and acting as team manager. Collaborating with Maxxis tires, and on a shoestring budget, he would campaign a top three level team. This was a breakout year for Chris Forsberg Racing fueled by contingency money. Because they kept winning, Maxxis would match Formula Drift’s earned winnings. The team finished a strong second place overall, paving the way for his NOS Energy Drink sponsorship.

2006 
Nissan North America took notice of Chris' driving campaign efforts and so they gave him a convertible 350z for the 2006 season. The team swapped the stock VQ35DE engine for the Nissan Titan’s VK56DE V8. This was not a competitive car for Chris and he had to use his backup car, the SR20DET 350Z for a few rounds as he sorted out the V8 and its chassis. He had two unfavorable rounds of the seven, though he still qualified.

2005 
Chris competed in the Team Falken Password JDM Silvia S15. His last battle of the season was also the season finale and was against Rhys Millen in his GTO. Super Street documented the drama: “The finals between Rhys Millen and Team Falken’s Chris Forsberg would be something for the books however. On Forsberg’s old 350Z, he had a sticker that said “too close for missiles, switching to guns!” Well, in the season finale and the final battle, the sticker could have read ‘where there’s smoke, there’s fire!’ That’s right, in blazing glory and a fiery drift battle, Forsberg’s rear bumper lit up as he went completely sideways through the course at speeds only Millen could duplicate. A one more time was in the works which proved too much for Millen’s GTO. Suspension problems would ensue on the GTO as Forsberg continued his consistency through the track at blazing speed producing tons of smoke.” Chris moved on to win the round and would attain his first Formula Drift win.

2004 
In 2004 Chris placed second at his first ever Formula Drift event at Road Atlanta and followed it up with another podium finish at round 2 in Houston, Texas. As a privateer, Chris broke Sam Hubinette’s year long undefeated streak at Irwindale Speedway which could be looked at as one of the turning points of his career.

Chris would drive the 350Z SR20DET for part of the inaugural season, and for one race had to switch to a borrowed Nissan Silvia S13 because of technical difficulties. The SR20DET Z finished the campaign.

After Irwindale, the team participated in a D1 event in which Chris became the first American driver to beat a Japanese driver, Team Orange’s  Kazuhiro Tanaka.

Formula Drift Competition Cars 

|-

Special Projects and Vehicles 

1975 Datsun “Gold Leader” x RAD Industries 280Z

In 2014 Chris purchased a stripped-down RB motor equipped 1975 280Z for $4,000 with no intention of making it a show car, that is until AEM approached him about displaying it in their 2016 SEMA booth.

With help from RAD Industries some of the car’s build specs include: CarbonSignal seats, carbon/suede door cards/center console, widebody kit, TechnoToy Tuning suspension, Wilwood brakes, Speedhut meters, hydraulic handbrake, 500 hp RB25DET engine and custom SSR MS-1 wheels. “Gold Leader” would win SuperStreet/Meguiar’s Best in Show and the Sony Playstation Best Import award.

Nissan Rally 370Z x Broken Motorsports

The Rally Z buildout is an American Rally Association compliant homage to the 1971 East African Safari Rally overall winner Datsun 240Z. The collaboration between Nissan/Nismo and Broken Motorsports was intended for display at SEMA 2020, but because of the global pandemic it never saw the inside of a convention center.

2011 Toyota Nascar 2JZ-GTE x Good Enough! x Gumout

For his Youtube channel series Good Enough! Chris and the gang purchased an ex-Brandon McReynolds Nascar. Forsberg took it to Irwindale Speedway with Ryan Tuerck. Forsberg did one 1/8th mile pass, with a 0.499 reaction, for a 7.9466 at 94.38 mph where they would ultimately blow the engine. The guys swapped in a 2JZ-GTE making 750-800 horsepower; upgrades include Brian Crower rods, JE pistons, and a Garrett GTX4088 turbocharger.

2006 Infiniti M56 “La Flama Blanca” (the Party Car)

The M56 is a four seat demo drift car complete with a 500 hp VK56DE 5.6L V8 engine. Chris built this car in 2010 at his shop in Southern California with the idea of having a four seat ride along vehicle. The rollcage was custom designed and fabricated by Chris so that all four bucket seats (Recaro SPG driver seat; SPG XL passenger seats) are able to fit safely and securely. Engine mods include Nissan Motorsports individual throttle-bodies, Jim Wolf camshafts, and custom Tri-Y exhaust, which is mounted to a 350Z transmission, an ACT twin disc clutch, and a custom Driveshaft Shop driveshaft and axles.

2016 Chevrolet Silverado 1500 Jimmie Johnson x Valvoline

Valvoline reached out to Chris to build a brand new Silverado and then take it out with NASCAR champion Jimmie Johnson where Chris orchestrated the entire build. Some features include ICON Vehicle Dynamics suspension and wheels, tubular bumpers, Rigid LED lights, and some engine performance upgrades from K&N and Magnaflow. The truck was later given away in a sweepstakes.

2009 Nissan 370Z Twin Turbo x Drift Garage

Drift Garage, a Youtube series produced by Network A was hosted by Chris Forsberg and Ryan Tuerck. Chris, along with friends Dylan Hughes (fabricator) and Brian Wilkerson from MA Motorsports built a “just for fun” demonstration car with a “might as well…” build philosophy.

The 370Z was gutted and rebuilt completely after the show. Some of its features include: VQ35HR engine, Fast Intentions Stage II turbo kit, SSR SP4s wheels with Hankook RS3 tires, Nismo body kit, Seibon Carbon fiber body panels.

1988 Mazda “Forsberg’s First” RX7

Chris first purchased this car in March 2000 when he was 17 years old with the intention of learning how to drift, and would take it to the first Club Loose events at Englishtown Raceway Park. Since then it’s had four owners and in 2004 it nearly completed a full season of Formula Drift. In 2009 Chris purchased the car from Lindsay Ross. Slowly working on bringing it back to life over the past 10 years. The goal is a 250 hp naturally aspirated, easy to drive weekender package rather than lots of power and speed.

Motor Trend's "Drift This" 
Drift This was a 2019 web series produced by Motor Trend featuring Chris Forsberg and Ryan Tuerck. The premise of the show was to take improbable drift car candidates and modify them “using creative engineering, custom fabrication, and pure brute horsepower.”

Some of the vehicles featured in Drift This were a 35-foot Escalade limousine, a turbocharged LS UPS truck, a sandrail, a bubble Caprice, a military issue Humvee M998, and bumper cars.

Formula Drift Results, Accolades and Accomplishments 

 ALL TIME podium finisher in Formula Drift
 Most wins in head to head competition in Formula Drift
 Most consecutive podiums in Formula Drift (six)

2022 
 Placed 2nd at Formula Drift Round 2, Atlanta
 Placed 2nd at Formula Drift Round 3, Orlando
 Placed 3rd at Formula Drift Round 6, Seattle

2021 
 Formula Drift Comeback of the Year
 Placed 2nd at Formula Drift Round 4, Englishtown

2020 
 Formula Drift Hardest Charger of the Year
 Placed 2nd at Formula Drift Round 5, Dallas
 Placed 1st at Formula Drift Round 6, Dallas

2019 
 Placed 3rd at Formula Drift Round 1, Long Beach
 Placed 2nd at Formula Drift Round 2, Orlando
 Placed 3rd at Formula Drift Round 7, Texas

2018 
 Placed 1st at Formula Drift Round 2, Orlando
 Placed 3rd at Formula Drift Round 3, Atlanta

2017 
 Invited to run at the prestigious Goodwood Festival of Speed
 Placed 2nd at Formula Drift Round 6, Dallas

2016 
 FORMULA DRIFT WORLD CHAMPION
 FORMULA DRIFT CHAMPION
 Formula Drift Ace of the Year
 Placed 3rd at Formula Drift Round 2, Atlanta
 Placed 3rd at Formula Drift Round 3, Miami
 Placed 2nd at Formula Drift Round 4, Wall
 Placed 2nd at Formula Drift Round 5, Canada
 Placed 2nd at Formula Drift Round 6, Seattle
 Placed 2nd at Formula Drift Round 7, Dallas

2015 
 3rd OVERALL in Formula Drift Series Championship
 Placed 3rd at Formula Drift Round 2, Road Atlanta
 Placed 2nd at Formula Drift Round 3, Orlando
 Placed 3rd at Formula Drift Round 6, Texas Motor Speedway

2014 
 FORMULA DRIFT CHAMPION
 Formula Drift Top Qualifier of the Year
 Placed 1st at Formula Drift Round 1, Long Beach
 Placed 3rd at Formula Drift Round 2, Road Atlanta
 Placed 2nd at Formula Drift Round 3, Miami
 Placed 2nd at Formula Drift Round 4, Wall
 Placed 3rd at Formula Drift Round 5, Seattle
 Placed 3rd at Formula Drift Round 6, Texas Motor Speedway
 Placed 2nd at Irish Drift Championship Finale, Mondello Park, Ireland
 Placed 2nd at Red Bull Drift Shifters, New Zealand

2013 
 2nd OVERALL in Formula Drift Series Championship
 Formula Drift Ace of the Year
 Placed 3rd at Formula Drift Round 1, Long Beach
 Placed 3rd at Formula Drift Round 4, Wall
 Placed 1st at Formula Drift Round 5, Seattle
 Placed 3rd at Formula Drift Round 6, Dallas

2012 
 Placed 2nd at Formula Drift Round 3, West Palm Beach
 Placed 3rd at Formula Drift Round 4, Wall

2011 
 3rd OVERALL in Formula Drift Series Championship
 Formula Drift Team Manager of the Year
 Placed 2nd at Formula Drift Abu Dhabi, Yas Marina
 Qualified 1st at Formula Drift Round 3, West Palm Beach
 Placed 2nd at Formula Drift Round 5, Seattle
 Placed 3rd at Formula Drift Round 7, Irwindale
 Judge of the Xtreme Drift Circuit Championship series

2010 
 6th OVERALL in Formula Drift Series Championship
 Placed 1st at Formula Drift Team Drift, Long Beach Grand Prix
 Placed 3rd at Formula Drift Round 2, Road Atlanta
 Judge of the Xtreme Drift Circuit Championship series

2009 
 FORMULA DRIFT CHAMPION
 TIRES.COM TRIPLE CROWN CHAMPION
 Formula Drift Driver of the Year
 Qualified 1st at Formula Drift Round 1, Long Beach
 Placed 1st at Formula Drift Team Drift, Long Beach Grand Prix
 Placed 1st at Formula Drift Round 2, Road Atlanta
 Placed 3rd at Formula Drift Round 4, Las Vegas
 Placed 1st at Formula Drift Round 5, Seattle

2008 
 5th OVERALL in Formula Drift Series Championship
 6th OVERALL in Formula Drift World Finals
 Nominated Team Owner of the Year
 Placed 1st at Formula Drift Round 1, Long Beach Grand Prix
 Placed 1st at Formula Drift Team Drift, Long Beach Grand Prix
 Placed 1st in Formula Drift Team Drift Championship with Drift Alliance

2007 
 TIRES.COM TRIPLE CROWN CHAMPION
 2nd OVERALL in Formula Drift Series Championship
 Placed 1st at Formula Drift Round 2, Road Atlanta
 1st privately owned team to win a Formula Drift Pro Championship event
 Qualified 1st at Formula Drift Round 3, West Virginia
 Placed 1st at Ziptied All Star Team Drift, Willow Springs
 Placed 1st at Formula Drift Team Drift, San Jose
 Placed 1st at Formula Drift Round 5, Infineon Raceway
 Placed 2nd at Formula Drift Round 7, Irwindale Speedway
 Judge of the 2007 Drift Mania Canadian Championship series

2006 
 Formula Drift Best Looking Car of the Year
 Placed 1st at Formula Drift Team Drift, Long Beach
 Placed 1st at World Drift Series Team Drift Beijing, China

2005 
 Formula Drift Best Comeback of the Year
 Placed 1st at Formula Drift Round 6, Irwindale
 1st American to defeat a Japanese D1 driver in tandem competition
 Placed 5th in first ever D1 Grand Prix US vs. Japan, Irwindale Speedway

2004 
 3rd OVERALL in Formula Drift Series Championship
 Placed 2nd at inaugural Formula Drift, Road Atlanta
 Placed 3rd at Formula Drift Round 2, Houston
 First American built drift car on the cover of a national magazine
 Only driver to defeat champion Samuel Hubinette in Formula D 2004 season competition.

2003 
 Course designer and instructor at first organized East Coast events. (DGTrials 2003)
 Aces High member of DGTrials.
 Featured in October 2003 Wired magazine article on drifting, alongside Tony Angelo

Miscellaneous Events, Demos and Exhibitions 

2018 - 2019 D1 China (BMW M4 2JZ, 3rd overall)

2017 - 2018 Goodwood Festival of Speed (attendee)

2016  SCORE Baja 1,000 (DNF)

2016 Battle BROyale (Can-Am Maverick X3)

2015 Belarus

2014 Irish Drift Championship (engine seize)

2014 Red Bull Drift Shifters New Zealand (2nd place)

2012 China World Drift Series: Team Drift (winner)

2011 Formula Drift Abu Dhabi: Yas Marina Circuit

2008 Chile Super Drift (Nissan 350Z SR20DET)

2008 Panama X-treme Wheels and Drift (Nissan 350Z SR20DET)

2006 - 2007 El Salvador (Nissan S13 VQ )

2006 China World Drift Series Team Drift (winner)

2005 Costa Rica (Nissan B210)

2005 - 2009 Indy Car/CHAMP Exhibitions: Texas Motor Speedway Ultimate Drifting

External links
The Official Web Site of Chris Forsberg
Formula D Profile

References 

Drifting drivers
D1 Grand Prix drivers
1982 births
Living people
Formula D drivers
People from Doylestown, Pennsylvania
Racing drivers from Pennsylvania